Helicodiscus hexodon, common name the toothy coil snail, is a species of small air-breathing land snail, a terrestrial pulmonate gastropod mollusk in the family Helicodiscidae.

Distribution
This species is found only in the United States.

References

Helicodiscidae
Gastropods described in 1966
Taxonomy articles created by Polbot